Omens is the eleventh studio album by American heavy metal band Lamb of God. The album was released on October 7, 2022, through Epic Records and Nuclear Blast. It was produced by Josh Wilbur, who has collaborated with the band since 2006.

Omens sold 19,000 copies in its first week, including 5,100 of pure vinyl sales. It debuted at No. 15 on the Billboard 200, and also debuted at the No. 1 of Top Hard Rock Albums, No. 3 of Album Sales, No. 3 of Top Rock Albums and No. 5 of Vinyl Albums.

Background 
The band's previous album, the self-titled Lamb of God, was released in 2020 shortly after the beginning of the COVID-19 pandemic. The band was unable to tour behind that album, thus disrupting their usual cycle of recording and releasing albums, with each followed by a supporting tour, The band was unaccustomed to the downtime in 2020–2021, so they decided to create a new album with Omens being written and developed more quickly than their previous albums. The album's release was accompanied by a documentary film called The Making Of: Omens, which is available at the band's website.

The album's lyrics are informed by the social upheavals experienced in the United States since 2020, including the debate over the history of the band's hometown of Richmond, Virginia in the song "Nevermore", plus awareness of international environmental issues informed by singer Randy Blythe's recent advocacy work with indigenous communities in the United States and Ecuador. Most of the album was recorded live in the same room, as a departure from the online sharing of tracks that many bands had to adopt during the pandemic.

Critical reception 

The album received generally positive reviews from the music media. Kerrang! concluded that "Omens finds the Virginia metal bruisers returning sounding as reliably heavy, violent, and pissed-off as ever." According to Spin magazine, the album grabs "listeners by their prefrontal cortexes, shaking the metal faithful around to what the hell is going on as they blissfully mosh through the ruins of modern living."

Metal Injection noted that the album mixes in some elements of other genres that have rarely appeared in Lamb of God releases before, including hardcore punk, and described "a genuine thread of palpable lament woven through every track". Distorted Sound also noticed the influence of hardcore punk, plus a "raw" feel arising from the live recording techniques used in the studio, and concluded that "Omens is another incredible album to add to an already stacked back catalogue that features just enough subtle additions to keep the band still sounding as fresh as ever."

Track listing

Personnel 
Lamb of God
 D. Randall Blythe – vocals
 Mark Morton – guitar
 Willie Adler – guitar
 John Campbell – bass
 Art Cruz – drums

Technical
 Josh Wilbur – production, mastering, mixing, engineering
 Nick Rowe – engineering
 Mark Aguilar – engineering assistance

Charts

References 

2022 albums
Lamb of God (band) albums
Nuclear Blast albums